William Carlos Stone (October 9, 1859 – February 23, 1939), called "Uncle Billy" by his friends, of Springfield, Massachusetts, was a philatelist who specialized in the collection of philatelic literature related to revenue stamps and postal stationery.

Collecting interests
Stone collected and studied United States revenue stamps, and, at the same time, accumulated a large library consisting mostly of philatelic literature related to revenue stamps. He assisted his fellow philatelist William Reynolds Ricketts in the preparation of Ricketts' famous index of philatelic literature.

Philatelic activity
Stone helped found the American Philatelic Association, which later became the American Philatelic Society, and he continued to support the organization his entire philatelic career.

Honors and awards
Stone was named to the American Philatelic Society Hall of Fame in 1947.

Legacy
Stone's collection of revenue stamp philatelic literature was sold in 1939 to George Townsend Turner, who later donated it to the Smithsonian Institution where it now resides in the National Postal Museum in Washington, D.C.

See also
 Philately
 Philatelic literature

References

1859 births
1939 deaths
Philatelic literature
American philatelists
Smithsonian Institution donors
People from Springfield, Massachusetts
American Philatelic Society